William Prather Curlin Jr. (November 30, 1933 – December 12, 2022) was an American politician and lawyer from Kentucky. He was a former member of the United States House of Representatives.

Born in Paducah, McCracken County, Kentucky, Curlin graduated from Frankfort High School.  Curlin earned an A.B. and LL.B. from the University of Kentucky in 1958 and 1962, respectively.  He served in the United States Army from 1955 to 1957.

As an attorney Curlin engaged in private practice and was an attorney and assistant commissioner with the Kentucky Department of Revenue from 1962 through 1964.  He served as a member of the Kentucky General Assembly from 1968 to 1971 as a member of the Kentucky House of Representatives.  In the House Curlin served as chairman of the Appropriations and Revenue Committee during the 1970 session.

Curlin was elected as a Democrat to the Ninety-second Congress by special election to fill the vacancy caused by the death of United States Representative John C. Watts and served in Congress (from December 4, 1971, through January 3, 1973).  Curlin was not a candidate for reelection to the Ninety-third Congress in 1972 and after serving in Congress he returned to the private practice of law.

Curlin was a resident of Versailles, Kentucky.

He died on December 12, 2022.

References

1933 births
2022 deaths
People from Paducah, Kentucky
People from Versailles, Kentucky
Kentucky lawyers
Democratic Party members of the Kentucky House of Representatives
University of Kentucky alumni
Military personnel from Kentucky
United States Army soldiers
Democratic Party members of the United States House of Representatives from Kentucky